Triuncina religiosae is a moth in the family Bombycidae. It was described by Johann Wilhelm Helfer in 1837. It is found in India.

References

Bombycidae
Moths described in 1837